A Special Kind of Hero is a song by Stephanie Lawrence that was served as the theme song of Hero (1986 FIFA World Cup Official Film)

The World Cup Greatest Hits album on which this track is allegedly re-released in fact does not contain this song. Somehow there was a mix-up resulting in the  Official FIFA Anthem that was first used in the 1994 World Cup replacing it, but still being labeled as Special Kind of Hero. The only source from which the real song can be heard today is Hero - The Official Film of 1986 FIFA World Cup: Hero.

It was written by Nik Kershaw.

See also
 Hero (1987 film)

References

External links

1986 singles
FIFA World Cup songs
1986 FIFA World Cup